Haldun Ozaktas from the Bilkent University, Bilkent, Turkey was named Fellow of the Institute of Electrical and Electronics Engineers (IEEE) in 2014 for contributions to transforms for signal processing in optics.

References

External links
Bilkent University Bio

Fellow Members of the IEEE
Living people
Academic staff of Bilkent University
21st-century American engineers
Year of birth missing (living people)
Place of birth missing (living people)